Faith Friday Obilor (born 5 March 1991) is a Nigerian professional footballer who plays as a defender for Kazakhstan Premier League club Aksu.

Career

Club
In 2011, he came from Nigeria to join PS Kemi in Finnish 2nd league Ykkönen. He changed clubs after the first season as PS Kemi was relegated and continued to play in Ykkönen another year. After playing 7 matches with FC Inter, Obilor joined RoPS and formed a defensive partnership with fellow Nigerian Nduka Alison, and RoPS secured a promotion to Veikkausliiga at the end of the 2012 season.

On 29 November 2016, Obilor signed a two-year contract with HJK.

Honours
RoPS
Ykkönen (1): 2012
Finnish Cup (1): 2013
Npfl 2014

Individual
Veikkausliiga Defender of the Year: 2015, 2018 
Veikkausliiga Team of the Year: 2018

References

External links

1991 births
Living people
People from Aba, Abia
Nigerian footballers
Nigerian expatriate footballers
Babanawa F.C. players
AmaZulu F.C. players
FC Inter Turku players
Rovaniemen Palloseura players
Kemi City F.C. players
Helsingin Jalkapalloklubi players
FC Sheriff Tiraspol players
FC Taraz players
Veikkausliiga players
Ykkönen players
Moldovan Super Liga players
Kazakhstan Premier League players
Association football defenders
Nigerian expatriate sportspeople in South Africa
Nigerian expatriate sportspeople in Finland
Nigerian expatriate sportspeople in Moldova
Expatriate soccer players in South Africa
Expatriate footballers in Finland
Expatriate footballers in Moldova
Expatriate footballers in Kazakhstan